Pores Knob is a mountain peak located in Wilkes County, North Carolina, USA.

Physical features
Pores Knob is the highest point of the Brushy Mountains chain. The Brushy Mountains are a deeply eroded spur of the much larger Blue Ridge Mountains.

Geographical location
The mountain itself is nearly unconnected to any other peak in the Brushy Mountains, and could thus be considered a monadnock, or isolated mountain peak. A rough gravel road leads to the mountain's summit, which is devoid of trees but does contain several radio towers. From the summit a person can see up to 75 miles on a clear day, and can view a large portion of the Appalachian Mountain range in North Carolina, several of the highest mountains in the state of Virginia, and the skyline of Charlotte, North Carolina, approximately 70 miles to the south. The mountain shares its name with a small farming community which surrounds the peak.

See also
Brushy Mountains
Moravian Falls, North Carolina
Geography of North Carolina

References

Mountains of North Carolina
Landforms of Wilkes County, North Carolina
Inselbergs of Piedmont (United States)